Abdellah Chebira (born July 12, 1986, in Blida) is an Algerian professional footballer. He is currently playing as a left-back for USM Annaba in the Algerian Ligue Professionnelle 2.

International career
In 2006, Chebira was called up to the Algerian Under-23 National Team for a training camp in Algiers. In 2007, he was a member of the Under-23 National Team at the 2007 All-Africa Games. He came in a substitute in two group games against Zambia and Guinea.

On April 16, 2008, Chebira was called up to the Algerian A' National Team for a 2009 African Nations Championship qualifier against Morocco.

References

External links
 DZFoot Profile
 

1986 births
Living people
People from Blida
Algerian footballers
USM Annaba players
USM Blida players
Algerian Ligue Professionnelle 1 players
Algeria under-23 international footballers
Algerian Ligue 2 players
Association football fullbacks
21st-century Algerian people